Farnell element14 is a  distributor of products for electronic system design, maintenance and repair. Operating in 28 countries across Europe, with two regional distribution hubs in Belgium and the UK, it employs circa 1,200 people. It is the European trading brand of global electronics distributor Premier Farnell.

History
The company, which was established as the European arm of Premier Farnell, introduced the element14 brand name in 2010, replacing the legacy brands of Premier Electronics, Farnell and Farnell-Newark with Farnell element14 and Newark element14. The name was taken from silicon, the 14th element in the Periodic Table, which is widely used in electronic components such as integrated circuits and discrete semiconductors.

Products
Development kits (often called ‘dev kits’) are a major specialism of Farnell element14. These are hardware kits typically centred around a particular microprocessor or microcontroller and are used by design engineers to develop and prototype new products. A survey of engineers on the element14 Community identified the big areas for the market in 2014-2015 as being lighting control, sensing and wireless. Another growth area for Farnell element14 is the Internet of Things (IoT), which was the predominant theme at its stall at the electronica fair held in Munich on 11-14 November 2014, showcasing element14 IoT products such as the RIoTboard.

The BBC announced on 7 July 2015 that it was launching a new computer device called the micro:bit that would be given to every Year 7 school pupil in the UK (amounting to around one million computers) in October 2015 as part of its Make It Digital initiative. Farnell element14 was named as one of the major partners in the consortium behind the micro:bit, taking responsibility for sourcing of components and overseeing the manufacturing process.

See also 
 Premier Farnell

References

External links
Farnell Homepage

Companies based in Leeds
Electronic component distributors
Consumer electronics retailers of the United Kingdom